Hassan Al-Asmari (born 6 October 2002) is a Saudi Arabian professional footballer who plays as a right back for Najran on loan from Al-Ittihad.

Career
Al-Asmari started his career at the youth team of Al-Ittihad and represented the club at every level.

References

External links
 

2002 births
Living people
Saudi Arabian footballers
Association football fullbacks
Ittihad FC players
Najran SC players
Saudi Professional League players
Saudi First Division League players